Ulmus 'Cathedral' is a hybrid cultivar raised at University of Wisconsin–Madison (no. W44-25) patented in 1994.  Arising from a chance crossing of the Japanese elm (female parent) and Siberian elm, seed was sent in 1958 by Prof. Nobuku Takahashi and his colleagues at the Sapporo Botanical Garden of Hokkaido University, Sapporo, to Eugene Smalley at Wisconsin–Madison; 'Cathedral' is thus a sibling of 'Sapporo Autumn Gold'.

Description
The tree is distinguished by its weeping form and large elliptic leaves, < 14 cm long by < 8 cm broad, almost the same size and shape of those of its female parent, the Japanese Elm, spinach green when mature, turning yellow and orange in autumn.

Pests and diseases
Tests in the United States have found 'Cathedral' to be less resistant to Dutch elm disease than its WARF stablemates such as 'New Horizon', although damage is usually confined to the branch tips. Studies in France by the Institut National de la Recherche Agronomique (INRA) confirmed the tree as only 'moderately resistant'. The leaves are also favoured by leaf hoppers and other insects that feed by piercing and sucking.

Cultivation
The tree requires relatively high levels of maintenance owing to its predilection for breaks occasioned by branch inclusions. 'Cathedral' is widely available across the United States, and has also been commercially released in Europe.

Etymology
The tree was named by Mr Donald Willeke of Minneapolis, who observed that where planted in tight rows, a series of gothic cathedral-like arches was ultimately created between the trees.

Accessions

North America
Brenton Arboretum, US. 5 trees, acquired 2009. Acc. no. not known.
Holden Arboretum, US. Acc. no. 91–202
Morton Arboretum, US. Acc. no. 205–2008, 30–2009

Europe
Grange Farm Arboretum , Sutton St James, Spalding, Lincs., UK. Acc. no. 1058.

Nurseries

North America
Bailey Nurseries , St Paul, Minnesota, US.
Johnson's Nursery , Menomonee Falls, Wisconsin, US.
Linder's Garden Center , St. Paul, Minnesota, US.
Sherman Nurseries , Charles City, Iowa, US.
Sun Valley Garden Centre , Eden Prairie, Minnesota, US.

Europe
Future Forests , Kealkill, Bantry, County Cork, Ireland.
Noordplant kwekerijen , Glimmen, Netherlands.

References

External links
http://www.extension.iastate.edu/Publications/SUL4.pdf Summary, inc. photographs, of elm cultivars resistant to Dutch elm disease available in the United States.

Hybrid elm cultivar
Ulmus articles with images
Ulmus